Borongaj is a neighborhood in the Peščenica – Žitnjak district of Zagreb, Croatia. It is situated south of the main railway along Branimir Avenue and east of Donje Svetice Road. It is the location of the former Borongaj Airfield. For administrative purposes, Borongaj is part of the "Bruno Bušić" local committee.

References 

Neighbourhoods of Zagreb